Coralliophila giton is a species of sea snail, a marine gastropod mollusk in the family Muricidae, the murex snails or rock snails.

Distribution
This marine species occurs off Senegal.

References

 Adanson, M., 1757 Histoire naturelle du Sénégal. Coquillages, p. 275 p, 18 pls
 Dautzenberg, P., 1891. Voyage de la Goelette Melita aux Canaries et au Sénégal, 1889-1890. Mollusques Testacés. Mémoires de la Société Zoologique de France 4: 16-65, 1pl

Gastropods described in 1891
Coralliophila